Songs of the Season is the eighteenth studio album and the second Christmas album by American country music artist Randy Travis. It was released by Word Records on September 25, 2007. The album peaked at number 26 on the Billboard Top Country Albums chart. The album has sold 191,600 copies in the United States as of November 2017.

Track listing

Personnel
 Pat Bergeson - acoustic guitar, electric guitar, harmonica
 Dan Dugmore - dobro, acoustic guitar, pedal steel guitar
 Larry Franklin - fiddle, mandolin
 Steve Gibson - acoustic guitar
 Carl Gorodetzky - string contractor
 Tony Harrell - Fender Rhodes, harmonium, Hammond organ
 Wes Hightower - background vocals
 Sherilynn Huffman - background vocals
 David Hungate - bass guitar
 Shane Keister - Hammond organ, piano, electric piano
 Keith Nicholas - cello
 Paul Leim - drums
 Ann McCrary - background vocals
 Regina McCrary - background vocals
 Brent Mason - electric guitar
 The Nashville String Machine - strings
 Lisa Silver - background vocals
 Randy Travis - lead vocals
 Diane Vanette - background vocals
 Bergen White - string arrangements, conductor
 Casey Wood - bells, cymbals, Fender Rhodes, electric piano, shaker, sleigh bells, tambourine, triangle, vibraphone

Chart performance

References

2007 Christmas albums
Randy Travis albums
Word Records albums
Albums produced by Kyle Lehning
Christmas albums by American artists
Country Christmas albums